Alvin Jacob Wirtz (May 22, 1888 – October 27, 1951) was a lawyer, politician, and undersecretary to the Department of the Interior, and was born in Columbus, Texas to Lewis Milton and Dora (Dent) Wirtz. He attended Columbus, Texas, public schools and graduated from the University of Texas in 1910 with an LL.B. He married Kitty Mae Stamps of Seguin in 1913.  
In 1917 Wirtz and his family moved to Seguin, Texas, where he practiced law until 1934. Wirtz served as the Guadalupe County State Senator from 1922 to 1930. He served as the President Pro Tempore of the Texas Senate from 1925 to 1927. During his time in Seguin, Wirtz became involved in a group interested in developing the Guadalupe River as a source of hydroelectric power. Wirtz provided legal assistance to the Insull holding company Emery, Peck, and Rockwood as they built a chain of privately owned dams and hydroelectric projects on the Guadalupe River. In 1932 Wirtz was assisting the Emery, Peck, and Rockwood firm in a similar project on the Colorado River when the Insull empire collapsed. As a result, Wirtz was made receiver of the uncompleted Hamilton Dam, later renamed Buchanan Dam. To complete the dam, Wirtz promoted the creation of the Lower Colorado River Authority (LCRA). He wrote the state legislation that created the Authority, pushed for federal funding for the Authority's dams through the federal Public Works Administration along with James P. Buchanan and Lyndon B. Johnson. As the "father of the LCRA," Wirtz also helped federal funding what would become Mansfield Dam and other dams on the Colorado River.

Early life

References

Works cited
 

Democratic Party Texas state senators
1951 deaths
1888 births
People from Columbus, Texas
20th-century American politicians